Oxyethira forcipata is a species of microcaddisfly in the family Hydroptilidae. It is found in North America.

References

Hydroptilidae
Articles created by Qbugbot
Insects described in 1934